The White Swan Hotel is a 28-story luxury hotel in Guangzhou, Guangdong, China, located on Shamian Island, overlooking the Pearl River and facing the White Swan Pool. The hotel is reached by its own private  causeway.

History
The hotel opened on February6, 1983. It was built by Hong Kong businessman Fok Ying-tung. Located on the Cantonese equivalent of Dejima of pearl-rich Nagasaki in Japan (Exit Island in Japanese), the Hotel`s surroundings are rich in history of the Merchant houses incorporated in the Nations of the "Great Powers" and Holland; often attributed to have been the greatest force of modernisation in East-Asia. The colonial-era buildings are within easy walking-distance, and are a quaint reminder of Guangzou`s historical multiculturalism.

The hotel was built by Fok Ying-tung on Shamian Island for political reasons, and the hotel soon after hosted Hu Yaobang, Zhao Ziyang and Deng Xiaoping.

In the early 2000s, after 20 years of private operations, the hotel was handed out to the Chinese government. The hotel now belongs to The Ministry of Land and Resources of People's Republic of China.

The hotel closed down for renovations during three years and reopened in July 2015, on the 15th.

Description
The hotel has 520 rooms and suites. The White Swan's Jade River Restaurant, with its garden decor, is noted for its Cantonese cuisine.

Many American families who adopt children from China stay at the White Swan while in Guangzhou awaiting visa paperwork. A children's story book
is based on this.

Famous guests
The Guangzhou White Swan Hotel has received over 40 heads of state and government, including :
Dear Leader Kim Jong Il
 Queen Elizabeth II
 President George W. Bush
 Chancellor Helmut Kohl

Awards
 Member of "The Leading Hotels of the World" (1985)
 5 stars by the Chinese Government in February 1990
 "China's 50 best hotels" in 1996
 "China's best well-known hotel" in 2008.

References

External links

 Official hotel site

Hotels in Guangzhou
Liwan District
Hotel buildings completed in 1983
Hotels established in 1983
Chinese companies established in 1983